The Maine Trolley Cars are a group of 10 rail vehicles, mostly trolley cars, located in Kennebunkport, Maine. The cars were built in various years between 1893 and 1926, and the group was added to the National Register of Historic Places on November 14, 1980.  The trolley cars are a small part of the large collection of vehicles at the Seashore Trolley Museum.  While the museum's collection of more than 250 vehicles includes ones from several different U.S. states and a few foreign countries, the 10 vehicles in the National Register listing were all operated in the state of Maine at one time.

Listing

The following vehicles are included in the listing:
Passenger car #14, Narcissus, of the Portland-Lewiston Interurban
Baggage/express/mail car #8 of the Mousam River Railroad (unpowered trailer)
Passenger car #31 of the Biddeford and Saco Railroad
Locomotive/express car #52 of the Aroostook Valley Railroad
Passenger car #70 of the Aroostook Valley Railroad
Passenger car #82 of the York Utilities Company
Passenger car #88 of the York Utilities Company
Locomotive #100 of the Atlantic Shore Line Railway
Railway post office/express car #108 of the Portsmouth, Dover & York Street Railway
Passenger car #615 of the Portland Railroad Company

See also
National Register of Historic Places listings in York County, Maine

References

External links

National Register of Historic Places in York County, Maine
Transportation in York County, Maine
Railway vehicles on the National Register of Historic Places
Kennebunkport, Maine
Rail transportation on the National Register of Historic Places in Maine